Aloeides depicta, the depicta copper, is a butterfly of the family Lycaenidae. It is found in South Africa, where it is known from fynbos and Nama Karoo along the mountains from Matjiesfontein to Gydo Mountain and the Eastern Cape.

The wingspan is 26–29 mm for males and 29–35 mm females. Adults are on wing from September to June. There are continuous generations in warmer months.

The larvae feed on Aspalathus species. They shelter under rocks close to their food plant.

References

Butterflies described in 1968
Aloeides
Endemic butterflies of South Africa